In Saint-Pierre and Miquelon there are three amateur clubs, playing only one level. The league is played from the beginning of June and the end of September each year due to climatic conditions. The current president is Hervé Huet.

History
The league was organized primarily by Louis Quedinet who would go on to be president of the league for eighteen years. For his efforts, he was inducted into the Newfoundland and Labrador Soccer Hall of Fame in 2013.

Clubs
As of 2020 season:

Champions 
 1976 : AS Ilienne Amateur
 1977 : AS Ilienne Amateur
 1978 : AS Ilienne Amateur
 1979 : AS Ilienne Amateur
 1980 : AS Ilienne Amateur
 1981 : AS Ilienne Amateur
 1982 : AS Ilienne Amateur
 1983 : AS Ilienne Amateur
 1984 : AS Ilienne Amateur
 1985 : AS Ilienne Amateur
 1986 : AS Ilienne Amateur
 1987 : AS Ilienne Amateur 
 1988 : AS Saint-Pierraise 
 1989 : AS Ilienne Amateur
 1990 : AS Ilienne Amateur
 1991 : AS Ilienne Amateur
 1992 : AS Saint-Pierraise
 1993 : AS Saint-Pierraise
 1994 : AS Saint-Pierraise
 1995 : AS Saint-Pierraise
 1996 : AS Ilienne Amateur
 1997 : AS Saint-Pierraise
 1998 : AS Saint-Pierraise
 1999 : AS Miquelonnaise 
 2000 : AS Saint-Pierraise
 2001 : AS Saint-Pierraise
 2002 : AS Ilienne Amateur
 2003 : AS Ilienne Amateur
 2004 : AS Ilienne Amateur
 2005 : AS Miquelonnaise  
 2006 : AS Ilienne Amateur
 2007 : AS Saint-Pierraise
 2008 : AS Miquelonnaise
 2009 : AS Ilienne Amateur
 2010 : AS Ilienne Amateur
 2011 : AS Ilienne Amateur
 2012 : AS Ilienne Amateur
 2013 : AS Ilienne Amateur
 2014 : AS Ilienne Amateur
 2015 : AS Saint-Pierraise
 2016 : AS Saint-Pierraise
 2017 : AS Ilienne Amateur
 2018 : AS Ilienne Amateur
 2019 : AS Saint-Pierraise
 2020 : AS Miquelonnaise
 2021 : AS Miquelonnaise
 2022 : AS Saint-Pierraise

See also
National team: Saint Pierre and Miquelon national football team
Football association: Football Federation of Saint-Pierre and Miquelon

References

External links
RSSSF Saint Pierre et Miquelon - List of Champions

 
Football in Saint Pierre and Miquelon
Saint